Larry Moseley Bell Sr. (born August 18, 1939) is a former Democratic member of the North Carolina General Assembly representing the state's twenty-first House district, including Sampson and Wayne counties. A retired school superintendent from Clinton, North Carolina, Bell started his first term in the State House in 2001. During a portion of his time in the legislature, he served as the majority whip. He did not run for re-election in 2018.

During the 2015 legislative session, Bell was one of 22 African Americans serving in the North Carolina House of Representatives.

During the 2016 legislative session, Bell was one of 11 Democrats to vote in favor of HB2, the controversial "Bathroom Bill."

Electoral history

2016

2014

2012

2010

2008

2006

2004

2002

2000

Committee assignments

2017-2018 Session
Appropriations
Appropriations - Education
State Personnel (Vice Chair)
Agriculture
Ethics
Homeland Security, Military, and Veterans Affairs
Pensions and Retirement

2015-2016 Session
Appropriations
Appropriations - Education
State Personnel (Vice Chair)
Agriculture
Commerce and Job Development
Pensions and Retirement

2013-2014 Session
Appropriations
State Personnel (Vice Chair)
Commerce and Job Development
Education
Homeland Security, Military, and Veterans Affairs
Regulatory Reform

2011-2012 Session
Appropriations
State Personnel
Agriculture
Commerce and Job Development
Education
Homeland Security, Military, and Veterans Affairs

2009-2010 Session
Appropriations
Agriculture
Alcoholic Beverage Control
Education
Ethics
Pensions and Retirement
Rules, Calendar, and Operations of the House
University Board of Governors Nominating

References

External links

|-

Living people
Democratic Party members of the North Carolina House of Representatives
1939 births
African-American state legislators in North Carolina
People from Clinton, North Carolina
East Carolina University alumni
North Carolina A&T State University alumni
Educators from North Carolina
21st-century American politicians
21st-century African-American politicians
20th-century African-American people